Ekerö is a locality (urban area) and the seat of Ekerö Municipality in Stockholm County, Sweden, with 11,524 inhabitants in 2017. It is also an alternative name of the island Ekerön, on which the Ekerö urban area is situated.

Sports
The following sports clubs are located in Ekerö:

 Ekerö IK
 Skå IK
 Mälaröarnas Ridklubb MäRK
 Ekerö TK

Notable people
Carolina Gynning, glamour model
Ewa Björling, politician
Lykke Li, singer
Agnetha Fältskog, singer, musician

See also 
 Ekeby oak tree

References

External links

Swedish municipal seats
Uppland
Populated places in Ekerö Municipality
Municipal seats of Stockholm County
Islands of Mälaren